Year 1302 (MCCCII) was a common year starting on Monday (link will display the full calendar) of the Julian calendar.

Events 
 By place 

 Byzantine Empire 
 Spring – Co-Emperor Michael IX (Palaiologos) launches a campaign which reaches south up to Magnesia on the Maeander (near Ephesus). He seeks to confront the Turkish forces, but is dissuaded by his generals. In the meantime, the Turks resume their raids, isolating Michael at Magnesia. His army is dissolved without a battle, as the local forces are left behind to defend their homes. The Alans (Byzantine mercenaries) too leave, to rejoin their families in Thrace. Michael is forced to withdraw by the sea, followed by another wave of refugees. 
 July 27 – Battle of Bapheus: To counter the Turkish threat at Nicomedia, Emperor Andronikos II (Palaiologos) sends a Byzantine force (some 2,000 men) to cross over the Bosporus to relieve the city. On the plain, Turkish forces (some 5,000 light cavalry) led by Sultan Osman I (or Othman) defeat the Byzantines, who are forced to withdraw to Nicomedia. After the battle, Andronikos loses control of the countryside of Bithynia, withdrawing to the forts. Meanwhile, Turkish forces capture Byzantine settlements, such as the coastal city of Gemlik.Laiou, Angeliki E. (1972). Constantinople and the Latins: Foreign Policy of Andronicus II, 1282–1328, pp. 90–91. Harvard University Press. .
 October 4 – Andronikos II (Palaiologos) signs a peace treaty with the Republic of Venice, ending the Byzantine–Venetian War. The Venetians return most of their conquests – but keep the islands of Kea, Santorini, Serifos and Amorgos – which are retained by the privateers who have captured them. Andronikos agrees to repay the Venetians for their losses sustained during the massacre of Venetian residents (see 1296).

 Europe 
 April 8 – Sultan Muhammad II dies after a 29-year reign and is succeeded by his son Muhammad III as ruler of Granada. Within two weeks of his accession, he sends a Nasrid army under Hammu ibn Abd al-Haqq to seize Bedmar and other neighboring strongholds from Castile. Nasrid forces also attack Jódar, northeast of Bedmar, and recapture Quesada. Meanwhile, Muhammad contains friendly relations with King James II (the Just).
 April 10 – The first meeting of the Estates General in France is convened King Philip IV (the Fair) at the Notre-Dame in Paris. During the assembly, all three classes – the French nobles, clergy, and commons – discuss the conflict between Philip and Pope Boniface VIII about the papal legate, Bernard Saisset – who is accused to raise a rebellion of Occitan independence, associated with Navarre, under the banner of the County of Foix.
May 18 – Bruges Matins: The French garrison in Bruges is massacred at night, by members of the local Flemish militia. The revolt is instigated by Pieter de Coninck and Jan Breydel. Approximately 2,000 soldiers are killed, Jacques de Châtillon, governor of Flanders, escapes disguised as a priest with a handful of soldiers. He arrives in Paris to bring the news of the massacre to Philip IV (the Fair), who sends an army to capture the city.
 July 11 – Battle of the Golden Spurs: Flemish forces led by William of Jülich (the Younger) and Pieter de Coninck defeat the French army (some 9,000 men) at Kortrijk in Flanders. The cavalry charges of the French prove unable to defeat the untrained Flemish infantry militia, consisting mainly of members of the craft guilds. Many French nobles (some 500 knights) are killed, like the commander Robert II of Artois, and forced to retreat.
 August 31 – Treaty of Caltabellotta: King Charles II (the Lame) makes peace with Frederick III, ending the War of the Sicilian Vespers. The Kingdom of Sicily will pass to Angevin rule on Frederick's death, in return Charles pays a tribute of some 100,000 ounces of gold. Frederick hands over all his possessions in Calabria and releases Charles' son Philip I, prince of Taranto, from his prison in Cefalù.
 September – Roger de Flor, Italian  military adventurer and knight (condottiere), founds the Catalan Company, with soldiers (Almogavars) jobless after the Treaty of Caltabellotta.

 England 
 Spring – King Edward I (Longshanks) and the Scottish nobles led by Robert the Bruce sign a peace treaty for 9 months. John Segrave is appointed to the custody of Berwick Castle, leaving him in charge with an English force of some 20,000 men. Robert, along with other nobles, gives his allegiance to Edward.
 March – Robert the Bruce marries the 18-year-old Elizabeth de Burgh at Writtle in Essex. She is the daughter of Richard Óg de Burgh (the Red Earl), a powerful Irish nobleman and close friend of Edward I (Longshanks).

 Levant 
 Autumn – Fall of Ruad: Sultan Al-Nasir Muhammad sends an Egyptian fleet (some 20 galleys) to Tripoli, where Mamluk forces are disembarked to siege and blockade the island of Ruad. A Crusader garrison (some 1,000 men) defend the fortress of Ruad and after a short siege the Knights Templar surrender on September 26. Grand Master Barthélemy de Quincy, all the Templar archers and Syrian Christian troops are executed.

 By topic 

 Cities and Towns 
 June 12 – The city of Rakvere in Estonia receives Lübeck trade rights.

 Religion 
 November 18 – Boniface VIII issues the papal bull Unam sanctam, which asserts the superiority of the papacy's spiritual power over secular rulers.
  The Temple of Confucius is erected in Beijing during the reign of Emperor Temür Khan (or Chengzong) of the Chinese Yuan Dynasty.

Births 
 November 30 – Andrew Corsini, Italian prelate and bishop (d. 1374)
 December 7 – Azzone Visconti, Italian nobleman and knight (d. 1339)
 Fang Congyi, Chinese Daoist priest and landscape painter (d. 1393)
 Hōjō Sadayuki, Japanese nobleman, governor and samurai (d. 1333)
 Konoe Tsunetada, Japanese nobleman (kugyō) and regent (d. 1352)
 Shihabuddeen Ahmed Koya, Indian Grand Mufti and writer (d. 1374)
 Tai Situ Changchub Gyaltsen, Tibetan ruler and politician (d. 1364)

Deaths 
 January 2 – Henry I, German nobleman and co-ruler (b. 1230)
 January 19 – Al-Hakim I, Abbasid ruler (caliph) of Cairo (b. 1247)
 January 26 – Godfrey Giffard, English Lord Chancellor and bishop
 February 1 – Andrea dei Conti, Italian priest and mystic (b. 1240)
 February 10 – Gerald Le Marescal, Irish archdeacon and bishop
 March 3 – Roger-Bernard III, French nobleman and knight (b. 1243)
 March 9 – Richard FitzAlan, English nobleman and knight (b. 1267)
 March 20 – Ralph Walpole, English cleric, archdeacon and bishop
 April 8 – Muhammad II (al-Faqih), Nasrid ruler of Granada (b. 1235)
 April 9 – Constance of Sicily, queen and regent of Aragon (b. 1249)
 May 2 – Blanche of Artois, queen and regent of Navarre (b. 1248)
 June 30 – Ingeborg Birgersdotter, Swedish noblewoman (b. 1253)
 July 11 (Battle of the Golden Spurs):
 Godfrey of Brabant, Dutch nobleman and knight
 Guy I of Clermont, French nobleman and knight
 Jacques de Châtillon, French governor and knight
 John I de Trie, French knight and trouvère (b. 1225)
 John I of Ponthieu, French nobleman and knight
 John II of Brienne, French nobleman and knight
 Pierre Flotte, French knight, lawyer and chancellor
 Raoul II of Clermont, French nobleman and knight
 Robert II, French nobleman and seneschal (b. 1250)
 Simon de Melun, French knight and Marshal (b. 1250)
 September 6 – John St. John, English knight and seneschal
 September 18 – Eudokia Palaiologina, empress of Trebizond
 September 26 – Barthélemy de Quincy, French Grand Master
 October 29 – Matthew of Aquasparta, Italian Minister General
 November 17 – Gertrude the Great, German mystic (b. 1256)
 December 2 – Audun Hugleiksson, Norwegian knight (b. 1240)
 December 13 – Adolf II, German nobleman and prince-bishop
 December 26 – Valdemar Birgersson, king of Sweden (b. 1239)
 December 29 – Vitslav II, Danish nobleman, knight and prince
 December 31 – Frederick III, German nobleman and knight
 Balian of Ibelin, Cypriot nobleman and seneschal (b. 1240)
 Dietrich of Apolda, German monk, hagiographer and writer
 Gerardo Bianchi, Italian churchman, cardinal and diplomat
 Godfrey Giffard, English chancellor and bishop (b. 1235)
 Henry III of Bar, French nobleman and knight (b. 1259)
 Henry le Walleis, English advisor, mayor and politician
 Hu Sanxing, Chinese historian and politician (b. 1230)
 Ibn Daqiq al-'Id, Egyptian scholar and writer (b. 1228)
 John Comyn II, Scottish nobleman, knight and regent
 John de Sècheville, English philosopher and scientist
 Lotterio Filangieri, Italo-Norman nobleman and knight
 Louis I, Swiss nobleman and knight (House of Savoy)
 Maghinardo Pagani, Italian nobleman and statesman
 William of March, English Lord Treasurer and bishop

References